Vervelles are small metal rivets used in Medieval armour to attach an aventail to a helmet. The rivet would extend out from the surface of the helmet and that extension contained a hole. A leather cord or metal wire would be strung through the vervelles in order to secure the strip of leather or metal (to which the maille aventail was attached) to the helmet.

Gallery

Bibliography 
 

Medieval armour
Western plate armour